Eddie Brown (1918–1992) was an American tap dancer.

Being Discovered

Brown entered a talent contest that was held in his hometown when he was sixteen years old. He won first place and was discovered by famous American entertainer Bill “Bojangles” Robinson, who offered him a job in New York. Brown’s parents would not allow him to travel across the country to dance because he was still in school, however Brown went to New York anyway. Since Brown was still underage, he lived on the money that he made from dancing on the streets until he turned 18, when he joined Robinson’s show at the Apollo Theater in Harlem.

Career

Brown danced professionally throughout the 1930s and 1940s as part of a trio with Carl Gibson and Jerry Reed, as well as being a solo dancer in nightclubs, and with swing and jazz musicians such as Jimmie Lunceford, Duke Ellington, and Dizzy Gillespie.Eddie Brown danced with Bill “Bojangles” Robinson, and toured with The Bill Robinson Revue for six years. The show traveled from New York to the West coast, but fell apart when Robinson posed the idea of taking the group to Richmond, VA. and the other dancers quit the tour because the idea of performing in the south made them anxious for their careers and safety.

Signature Style

Brown had a distinct style of tap dancing, and was best known for his “scientific tap.” At the time when Brown was developing his style, many dancers in Omaha were dancing to swing music. As Brown began to understand this style of tap dancing, he realized that rhythm was a key component.

After performing with Robinson, Brown danced as a soloist and developed his signature style. His dances were marked by syncopated steps and patterns. The specific style of tap that he performed and later taught to students was called “scientific rhythm.” Brown explained, “You heard all this music and rhythm but could not see where it was coming from.” “A good ear ain’t good or bad, but a good ear is what you need. That’s why tap is scientific.”

References 

1918 births
1992 deaths
Artists from Omaha, Nebraska
American tap dancers
20th-century American dancers